Wenxin Yinghua is a metro station on the Green Line operated by Taichung Metro in Xitun District, Taichung, Taiwan.

The station name is taken from its location at the intersection of Wenxin and Yinghua roads.

Station layout

References 

Taichung Metro
Railway stations in Taichung
Railway stations opened in 2020